Talmo Curto de Oliveira (born October 10, 1969),  known as Talmo, is a retired volleyball player from Brazil. He was a member of the Brazil men's national volleyball team that won the gold medal at the 1992 Summer Olympics in Barcelona, Spain defeating The Netherlands (3-0) in the final. He played as a setter.

External links
 Talmo Oliveira Profile
 

Brazilian men's volleyball players
Volleyball players at the 1992 Summer Olympics
Olympic volleyball players of Brazil
Olympic gold medalists for Brazil
1969 births
Living people
Place of birth missing (living people)
Olympic medalists in volleyball
Medalists at the 1992 Summer Olympics